The Party of Togolese Unity (PUT), initially known as the Committee of Togolese Unity (Comité de l'unité togolaise, CUT) until 1963, was a political party in Togo. The party was formed on 13 March 1941 as CUT and led by Sylvanus Olympio. CUT gradually became more radical, and from 1947 onwards it demanded self-determination. In 1951, a moderate faction broke away and formed the Union of Chiefs and Peoples of the North (UCPN). During the period from 1951 to 1958, CUT was the main opposition party in French Togoland, and represented the mainstream of the anticolonialist movement in the territory.

Electoral history

Presidential elections

National Assembly elections

References 
 Toulabor, Comi M. Le Togo sous Eyadéma. Paris: Karthala, 1986.

1941 establishments in French Togoland
1963 disestablishments in Togo
African and Black nationalist parties in Africa
Defunct political parties in Togo
Parties of one-party systems
Political parties disestablished in 1963
Political parties established in 1941
Political parties in French West Africa